RoboCop is a 2014 American superhero film directed by José Padilha and written by Joshua Zetumer, Edward Neumeier, and Michael Miner. It is a remake of the 1987 film of the same name, and the fourth installment of the RoboCop franchise overall. The film stars Joel Kinnaman as the title character, with Gary Oldman, Michael Keaton, Samuel L. Jackson, Abbie Cornish, Jackie Earle Haley, Michael K. Williams, Jennifer Ehle, and Jay Baruchel in supporting roles. Set in 2028, the film sees a detective become critically injured and turned into a cyborg police officer whose programming blurs the line between man and machine.

Screen Gems first announced a remake in 2005, but it was halted one year later. Darren Aronofsky and David Self were originally assigned to direct and write the film, respectively, for a tentative 2010 release. The film was delayed numerous times, and Padilha signed on in 2011. In March 2012, Metro-Goldwyn-Mayer Pictures (successor company to Orion Pictures until September 11, 2014, the studio that released the original film) announced an August 2013 release, but that was then changed to February 2014. The principal characters were cast from March to July 2012. Principal photography began in September 2012 in Toronto and Vancouver in Canada, with additional locations in Hamilton, in Canada, and Detroit in the United States.

RoboCop was released in the United States on February 12, 2014, by Sony Pictures Releasing. The film received mixed reviews, with praise for some of the cast's performances, action, updates, style and political/media satire, but criticism for its lack of violence, social satire and humor compared to the original film, and grossed $242.6 million against its $100–130 million budget.

Plot

In 2028, multinational conglomerate OmniCorp revolutionizes warfare by introducing robotic peacekeepers capable of maintaining law and order. Led by CEO Raymond Sellars, the company moves to market its technology to domestic law enforcement. However, the passage of the Dreyfus Act, forbidding deployment of militarized drones in the United States, prevents this. Aware that most Americans oppose the use of military systems in their communities, Sellars asks Dr. Dennett Norton and his research team to come up with an alternative. The result is a proposal for a cyborg police officer. However, Norton informs Sellars that only someone stable enough to handle being a cyborg can be turned into one, and some candidates are rejected.

A Detroit police detective, Alex Murphy, is chosen after he is critically injured in a car bomb explosion arranged by crime boss Antoine Vallon as revenge for Murphy's investigation into his activities. Norton persuades Murphy's wife, Clara, to sign off on the procedure. Upon waking up and realizing the extent of his transformation, a frustrated Murphy escapes, but Norton shuts him down and brings him back to the lab. As Norton reveals to Murphy that the only remnants of his human body are most of his head (excluding parts of the brain), respiratory organs, heart, and right hand, a disgusted Murphy asks for euthanasia. Norton reminds Murphy about his wife's and son's patience, convincing him to live. During combat training with trainer Rick Mattox, Murphy proves unable to compete with the standard OmniCorp drones efficiently. Norton alters Murphy's programming to make him more efficient by letting drone programming take over his actions, making Murphy think they are his. This re-programming increases Murphy's efficiency dramatically, but leaves him less empathetic, due to his human nature being bypassed. That night, Murphy goes to his house to meet Clara and his son David to make sure they are okay, comforting David.

Shortly before he is publicly unveiled, the entire police database is uploaded to RoboCop's system, including the Alex Murphy crime scene, leading Murphy to have an emotional breakdown, forcing Norton to suppress his emotions. During the ceremony, RoboCop identifies and apprehends a criminal in the crowd. He goes on to reduce crime in Detroit dramatically, simultaneously increasing public support for repealing the Dreyfus Act. Aware that Clara has begun to ask questions, Sellars orders Norton to keep her away from her husband.

Clara nevertheless manages to confront RoboCop, telling him of their son David's nightmares, social withdrawal, and unresponsive behavior. The experience drives Murphy to override his programming and access the previously sealed files on his attempted murder. From them, he learns his son had PTSD after witnessing the explosion. Murphy pursues Vallon's gang to exact revenge. He takes heavy damage from their armor-piercing weapons but manages to kill Vallon and his men. Murphy returns to the station and joins with his old partner, Jack Lewis. They confront the two corrupt police officers who betrayed him to Vallon, shooting one and tasing the other. Learning that the Chief of Police was also involved, Murphy moves to arrest her but is remotely shut down by Mattox.

With the help of pro-OmniCorp talk show host Pat Novak, Sellars uses the incident to get the Dreyfus Act repealed. Clara goes to the press and fiercely demands to see her husband. Fearful of being exposed, Sellars orders Mattox to destroy RoboCop while being repaired and tricks Clara into thinking that Murphy died. Norton reaches him first and reveals the truth. RoboCop narrowly escapes from the building just as it undergoes a lockdown.

Murphy returns and storms the building, fighting his way through the ED-209 drones sent to stop him, while Lewis and his fellow police arrive to hold off the rest of OmniCorp's forces. Mattox subdues Murphy, preparing to finish him off, but is killed by Lewis. Murphy then makes his way to the roof where Sellars is waiting for a helicopter with Clara and David as hostages. Murphy's programming initially prevents him from arresting Sellars. However, he overcomes his programming long enough to kill Sellars when Sellars overconfidently taunts him.

OmniCorp's parent company, OCP, shuts down the project. The President vetoes the repeal of the Dreyfus Act based on Norton's testimony, much to Novak's anger. Murphy's body is rebuilt in Norton's laboratory, and he waits for Clara and David, who are coming to visit him.

Cast 

 Joel Kinnaman as Alex Murphy / RoboCop: A young police detective who is injured in an explosion and transformed into the cyborg RoboCop 
 Gary Oldman as Dr. Dennett Norton: Omni foundation chief scientist who creates RoboCop
 Michael Keaton as Raymond Sellars: The CEO of OmniCorp
 Abbie Cornish as Clara Murphy: Alex's wife
 Jackie Earle Haley as Rick Mattox: A drone controller and automated military tactician expert responsible for training RoboCop
 Michael K. Williams as Jack Lewis: Alex's best friend and former partner
 Jennifer Ehle as Liz Kline: The head of OmniCorp legal affairs
 Jay Baruchel as Tom Pope: The head of marketing for OmniCorp
 Marianne Jean-Baptiste as Karen Dean: Detroit chief of police
 Samuel L. Jackson as Pat Novak: Host of The Novak Element and prominent supporter of mechanized crime control
 Zach Grenier as Dreyfus: A senator of Michigan
 Aimee Garcia as Jae Kim: A scientist who works with Dr. Dennett Norton
 Douglas Urbanski as Durant: The mayor of Detroit
 John Paul Ruttan as David Murphy: Alex and Clara's son
 Patrick Garrow as Antoine Vallon: A sadistic gang boss
 K. C. Collins as Andre Daniels
 Daniel Kash as John Lake

Production

Development

Screen Gems first announced that it was working on a new RoboCop film in late 2005; no further details were given. In November 2006, Bloody Disgusting reported that the RoboCop remake had been halted. In March 2008, RoboCop was mentioned in an Metro-Goldwyn-Mayer (MGM) press release regarding franchises it would be developing in the future. An MGM poster displayed at the Licensing International Expo of June 2008 read, "RoboCop coming 2010." The studio met with Darren Aronofsky to discuss the possibility of him directing the film. At the 2008 San Diego Comic-Con, Aronofsky was confirmed to direct the "2010 RoboCop" film, with David Self writing the script. The release date was postponed to 2011. At the San Diego Comic-Con in July 2009, MGM representatives stated only that the film would be pushed back to Summer 2010 or a later date, due to scheduling conflicts with the director (most likely Aronofsky). MGM representatives would neither confirm nor deny if Aronofsky was still connected with the project.

On January 5, 2010, it was reported that the RoboCop remake was indeed on hold and Aronofsky was still attached to direct. When MGM executives, particularly MGM chairperson Mary Parent, saw the immense success of the James Cameron film Avatar (2009), it was clear that they wanted a 3D film for the new RoboCop. Due to the financial state of MGM at the time, without an owner, and creative disagreements between the studio and Aronofsky, the film remained on hold. On March 2, 2011, it was announced that Brazilian director José Padilha was attached to direct, instead of Aronofsky, mainly because of his commercial success with Elite Squad (2007) and Elite Squad: The Enemy Within (2010). On March 11, 2011, Sean O'Neal of The A.V. Club stated that up-and-coming screenwriter Joshua Zetumer would write the script. Although Zetumer had been involved with a number of canceled or otherwise stagnant projects, he had also worked on the screenplay for Quantum of Solace (2008). Comparing the new work to the 1987 film, Padilha said in 2011, "the environment nowadays is different than the environment in the 80's and the way to explore the concept is different." It was announced in October 2013 that the film would get an IMAX release in February 2014. Columbia Pictures and Metro-Goldwyn-Mayer distributed the film in United States, Canada, and worldwide with the exclusion of United Kingdom, France, Germany, Switzerland and Austria, where StudioCanal handled distribution.

Pre-production
On April 12, 2011, rumors stated that MGM was looking at A-list stars such as Tom Cruise, Johnny Depp, and Keanu Reeves to star in the lead role of Alex Murphy/RoboCop in the upcoming remake. On June 16, 2011, pictures of promotional art were released, as well as a sales sheet from the Licensing International Expo 2011 in Las Vegas, NV, promoting a future release of RoboCop which would re-invent the franchise. The promotional material had sparse details of the film but clearly stated that MGM was targeting a 2013 release and Padilha was confirmed as director of the film. Michael Fassbender, Matthias Schoenaerts, and Russell Crowe were considered to play the title role. On March 3, 2012, it was confirmed that actor Joel Kinnaman would be playing the lead role, and on March 9, 2012, the film was given a release date of August 9, 2013. Hugh Laurie was set to play the role of the CEO of OmniCorp on June 13, 2012 but he later declined. Clive Owen was in the running to replace him until Michael Keaton was cast in the role in August 2012. Edward Norton, Sean Penn, Gael García Bernal, and Rebecca Hall were initially considered for the roles of Dr. Dennett Norton, Novak, Jack Lewis, and Clara Murphy, respectively. The roles ended up being cast with Gary Oldman, Samuel L. Jackson, Michael K. Williams, and Abbie Cornish. Jackie Earle Haley officially signed on in July 2012 to play a "military man named Mattox responsible for training Kinnaman's RoboCop". Jay Baruchel was confirmed to have signed onto the film on July 25, 2012, as Pope, a marketing exec for OmniCorp. Douglas Urbanski, cast as Mayor Durant, is typically a non-actor who is also the decades-long manager and producing partner of Gary Oldman. Rob Bottin's original costume for the title character was re-imagined. Initial reactions were unfavorable and some compared it with Christian Bale's Batman suit in Christopher Nolan's The Dark Knight films. News reports discussed a "rather derivative" design which "looks more like kevlar body armor than Detroit steel". The Guardian described the new RoboCop as "a crime-fighting machine who is not so much cyborg as skinny bloke in matte-black body armour." and said "The new Robosuit has a scaly, insectoid look to it, with a blacked-out visor rather than the original's steel extended helmet."

Before starting filming, Brazilian director Fernando Meirelles revealed that Padilha called him to admit he was having "the worst experience of his life" and "for every ten ideas he has, nine are cut". Padilha, according to Meirelles, said, "It's hell here. The film will be good, but I have never suffered so much and I don't want to do it again." However, Padilha talked enthusiastically about the project at the 2013 San Diego Comic-Con International and in his introduction to the second trailer. Production began in September 2012.

Filming
Filming took place in Toronto, other parts of Ontario, and Vancouver. Shooting locations within the city included the University of Toronto where a scene was filmed that appeared to be RoboCop being unveiled to the city of Detroit. Filming in Hamilton began on Monday, September 24, 2012, for five nights. Streets were closed for each of those days from 6pm to 7am. A spokesperson for MGM confirmed that the film was partially shot in Detroit.

Music

Pedro Bromfman, who collaborated with José Padilha on his Elite Squad films, composed the score.

Release

Marketing
An OmniCorp website was set up in early 2012. A film-specific RoboCop site was launched nearer the release date. A rough trailer and some film footage featuring Samuel L. Jackson's and Michael Keaton's characters was shown at the 2013 San Diego Comic-Con International. According to director Padilha, the first theatrical trailer was supposed to debut with Elysium, but it was instead released online on September 5, 2013, and was attached to showings of Riddick. Two further trailers were also released, one of which was uploaded to Yahoo! Movies with an introduction from Padilha, in which he said, "I'm thrilled to have had the chance to direct this movie ... I'm a fan of the original movie because it was ahead of its time both aesthetically and thematically. Back in '87, it was talking already about automated violence — both in war and law enforcement. And now, we actually have that happening in our lives and it's going to be more and more present. So we already have the drones. Now we're going to have automated robots doing law enforcement and replacing soldiers in the battlefield. So we had a chance to make this movie and talk about this." Two main posters were released in late 2013, with one showing CTBA complex in Madrid. TV spots were uploaded to Sony Pictures and StudioCanal UK's YouTube channels from January 2014. A video game for Android and iOS was released as a tie-in to the film. Jada Toys released a range of action figures, including a radio control RoboCop on his Police Cruiser and roleplay merchandise including the new RoboCop helmet and chestplate. Two detailed figures from the film were released in April 2014 from Play Arts Kai. The company threezero is also creating two RoboCop figures and a camo-coloured ED-209. Four one-shot comic tie-ins were published weekly starting from the week of theatrical release in the US. They were collected in a trade paperback edition under the title RoboCop: The Human Element to coincide with the home media releases.

Home media
RoboCop was released on DVD and Blu-ray on June 3, 2014, in the United States by 20th Century Fox Home Entertainment. Best Buy had an exclusive Metalpak edition, while the Target edition came with an exclusive digital download of the previously unreleased comic "Gauntlet". In the UK, an exclusive Amazon steelbook was made available on June 9.

RoboCop Day
To coincide with the home media releases, Detroit celebrated with "RoboCop Day" on June 3, 2014, during which RoboCop was photographed with fans throughout the city, and threw the first pitch at the Detroit Tigers game.

Reception

Box office
Robocop opened in 3,372 theaters in The United States and grossed $21,681,430, with an average of $6,430 per theater and ranking #3 at the box office. The film ultimately earned $58,607,007 domestically and $184,081,958 internationally for a total of $242,688,965, on a $100–130 million budget.<ref name=

Critical response

RoboCop received mixed reviews. The site's critical consensus reads, "While it's far better than it could have been, José Padilha's RoboCop remake fails to offer a significant improvement over the original." On Metacritic, which assigns a weighted average based on selected critic reviews, the film has a score of 52 out of 100 based on 41 critics, indicating "mixed or average reviews". Audiences surveyed by CinemaScore gave the film a "B+" grade, on an A+ to F scale.

RoboCop received several comparisons to the 1987 film; the consensus was that it fell short. Guy Lodge of Variety said that "It's a less playful enterprise than the original, but meets the era's darker demands for action reboots with machine-tooled efficiency and a hint of soul." Leslie Felperin from The Hollywood Reporter wrote that the remake "has a better cast, more meticulous script and, naturally, flashier effects, but it lacks the original's wit and subversive slipperiness." Andrew Osmond from SFX says, "It's not a classic like Paul Verhoeven's 1987 original, but it is an excellent, intelligent SF drama," believing it is "one of the boldest Hollywood reboots we've seen yet".

Chris Hewitt from Empire wrote, "there's a sense that Padilha, or perhaps his corporate overlords, don't really get what made the original so special." Nigel Andrews from Financial Times called it "a leaden, needless remake".  Peter Bradshaw of The Guardian wrote it was "a dumbed-down shoot-em-up frontloaded with elaborate but perfunctory new 'satirical' material in which the movie loses interest with breathtaking speed". His fellow Guardian film critic Mark Kermode rated it 3 out of 5 stars, writing that "against the odds, this emerges as far less depressing fare than one might have expected, retaining the key elements of political satire and philosophical musings that powered Verhoeven's original" and "at least it appears to have been made by someone who understands what made the original great."

Nancy Allen, who played Anne Lewis in the original trilogy, did not like the remake, as she pointed to a lack of ideas from major movie studios as part of the reason for the seemingly endless glut of remakes, and stated that she did not think one should "remake iconic films". Allen went on to praise the original's script and crew.

Future

Cancelled sequel
On September 11, 2015, Den of Geek reported that Sony was working on a sequel, though plans subsequently changed.

Reboot
In July 2018, it was announced the series would again be rebooted with a film directed by Neill Blomkamp, titled RoboCop Returns, which will serve as a direct sequel to Verhoeven's original film and ignore the events of previous sequels and the 2014 reboot. In August 2019, Blomkamp announced that he was no longer directing the film as he is focusing on directing a horror movie instead. On November 20, 2019, Abe Forsythe was set to direct.

See also
 List of films featuring drones

References

External links

 
 OmniCorp viral site
 
 

Cyberpunk films
RoboCop (franchise)
2014 films
2014 action thriller films
2010s science fiction thriller films
2010s superhero films
Remakes of American films
American science fiction action films
American science fiction thriller films
American superhero films
Columbia Pictures films
Cyborg films
Drone films
American dystopian films
Fictional portrayals of the Detroit Police Department
Films about amputees
American films about revenge
Films about terrorism
Films directed by José Padilha
Films produced by Marc Abraham
Films set in 2028
Films set in the future
Films set in China
Films set in Detroit
Films set in Tehran
Films set in Washington, D.C.
Films shot in Hamilton, Ontario
Films shot in Michigan
Films shot in Toronto
Films shot in Vancouver
IMAX films
Metro-Goldwyn-Mayer films
American police detective films
Reboot films
StudioCanal films
Techno-thriller films
2010s English-language films
2010s American films